Francesco Buccitelli (November 5, 1922 – February 17, 1989) was an Italian modern artist. He was active in post-war Italy depicting life in the Mezzogiorno in Italy.  He was influenced by the striking poverty of his homeland compared with the modernization of post-war Italy. He worked in various artistic media including drawing on paper and oils on both canvas and wood.

Life 

Buccitelli was born in 1922 in Pacentro, province of L'Aquila in the Abruzzo region of Italy to Luigi Buccitelli and Antonietta Corsetti. He studied at Istituto statale d'arte di Firenze in Florence, Italy. He served two terms as mayor (December 1964 - July 1970 and July 1970 - July 1975) of his hometown of Pacentro, Italy.  In 1988, he was awarded a 2nd Class / Grand Officer title by Order of Merit of the Italian Republic.

Work 

Buccitelli's work focused on life in the Mezzogiorno specifically in his hometown of Pacentro, Italy.

An example of his painting include "La Vicina di Casa / The Girl Next Door" showing the everyday life of inhabitants of his hometown.

His work has been widely shown throughout Italy and France. Exhibitions included "L'arte nella vita del Mezzogiorno d'Italia" in 1953 and the XIII Quadriennale of Contemporary Art in 1999, both in Rome, Italy.  His work "Verso Casa" is part of the permanent collection of the Pinacoteca di Bari "Corrado Giaquinto".

Legacy

Buccitelli's hometown of Pacentro recognized his lifetime achievements and had a prominent street named after him.

References

1922 births
20th-century Italian painters
Italian male painters
1989 deaths
20th-century Italian male artists